Heather Ann O'Reilly  (born January 2, 1985) is an American professional soccer player who plays as a midfielder for Irish club Shelbourne of the Women's National League. She played for the United States women's national soccer team (USWNT), with whom she won three Olympic gold medals and a FIFA Women's World Cup. From 2003 to 2006, she played college soccer for the University of North Carolina at Chapel Hill (UNC-CH). During her club career, O'Reilly played for the New Jersey Wildcats (USL W-League), Sky Blue FC (WPS), Boston Breakers (WPSL Elite and NWSL), FC Kansas City (NWSL), Arsenal Ladies (FA WSL), and the North Carolina Courage (NWSL).

Upon her initial retirement from international play in September 2016, she is one of the world's most capped soccer players with over 230 international appearances to her name. She is a skilled flank player, currently tied for fifth with Julie Foudy in USWNT history for assists. She is also the eighth most capped player in USWNT history. On October 27, 2019, she played her final match for the North Carolina Courage before retiring, winning the 2019 NWSL championship.

She is currently an analyst for Fox Sports. O'Reilly announced on July 28, 2022, that she would be coming out of retirement to play for Women's National League side Shelbourne and take part in their upcoming UEFA Women's Champions League campaign. As of 2019, O'Reilly is a volunteer assistant coach for the UNC-CH women's soccer team

Early life
Born to Andrew and Carol O'Reilly, Heather O'Reilly is the youngest of four children. Growing up in East Brunswick, New Jersey, O'Reilly attended Saint Bartholomew's School and later played on the girls soccer team at East Brunswick High School. In her four-year career, she scored 143 goals. As a junior in 2001, she led the team to the New Jersey state high school title.

Throughout high school, O'Reilly was a member of the National Honor Society and played on the school's basketball team. During her senior year, she was named All-American and National Player of the Year by Parade Magazine. In 2002, she was named the Gatorade High School National Player of the Year and the National Soccer Coaches Association Player of the Year. She was also named by Soccer America as the top college recruit in the country.

North Carolina Tar Heels, 2003–06

O'Reilly was an education major at the University of North Carolina, where she played forward for the North Carolina Tar Heels women's soccer program from 2003 through 2006. She appeared 97 times for the Tar Heels, scoring 59 goals and assisting on 49 others. She led her team to the national Championships in 2003 and 2006.

During her senior year, ESPN the Magazine named her the All-American Player of the Year and was awarded the NCAA's Today's Top VIII Award following her senior year. As a senior, she won the Honda Sports Award as the nation's top soccer player.

In 2006, O'Reilly's No. 20 jersey was retired by the program, joining athletes April Heinrichs, Lorrie Fair, Tisha Venturini, Kristine Lilly and Mia Hamm, along with 13 others.

Club career

New Jersey Wildcats, 2004–2005
O'Reilly played for New Jersey Wildcats of W-League from 2004 to 2005, winning the Championship in 2005.

Sky Blue FC, 2009–2011

O'Reilly was allocated to Sky Blue FC of Women's Professional Soccer on September 16, 2008, along with fellow U.S. national team players Natasha Kai and Christie Rampone. She appeared in 17 matches as co-captain during the 2009 inaugural season, leading Sky Blue to an unexpected playoff berth. During the Championship 2009 Women's Professional Soccer Playoffs match against Los Angeles, she scored the only goal helping her team clinch the Championship title.

Boston Breakers, 2012–2014
Following her husband's enrollment in Harvard Business School, O'Reilly trained with and played two matches with the Boston Breakers of the Women's Premier Soccer League Elite in 2012 after the WPS folded and during breaks with her national team duties. She was allocated to the Breakers in 2013 at the initiation of the new National Women's Soccer League.

FC Kansas City, 2015–2016
On October 27, 2014, FC Kansas City announced that it had acquired O'Reilly in a trade that sent Morgan Marlborough and Kassey Kallman to the Breakers.

Arsenal, 2017–2018
On January 18, 2017, Arsenal announced they had signed O'Reilly. The club is a member of the top division of the Football Association Women's Super League, the highest level of women's professional soccer in England. After 38 appearances in all competitions and four goals, it was confirmed by Arsenal that she would leave the club in the summer of 2018.

North Carolina Courage, 2018–2019
After FC Kansas City ceased operations, the Utah Royals FC maintained O'Reilly's NWSL rights. On June 28, 2018, the Courage traded Makenzy Doniak and a 2019 3rd round pick for O'Reilly and a 2019 2nd round pick. O'Reilly appeared in 8 regular season games and both playoff games for the Courage. North Carolina won the NWSL Shield & NWSL Championship.

North Carolina participated in the 2018 Women's International Champions Cup, O'Reilly started in the Championship Game and scored a goal in the 10th minute. The Courage defeated Olympique Lyonnais 1–0 to win the inaugural edition of the tournament.

On April 12, 2019, O'Reilly announced via social media that she would retire from professional soccer at the conclusion of the 2019 NWSL Season.

Shelbourne, 2022
On July 28, 2022, O'Reilly announced that she would be coming out of retirement to play for Irish champions Shelbourne, fulfilling her dream of playing in the UEFA Women's Champions League (UWCL). During her participation at Soccer Aid 2022, Arsène Wenger had suggested O'Reilly continue her playing career, which prompted her to look for a suitable UWCL club. She found Shelbourne's offer attractive because she is an Irish American.

O'Reilly made her Shelbourne debut on July 30, 2022, against Sligo Rovers.

On August 18, 2022, O'Reilly started for Shelbourne in their UEFA Women's Champions League qualifier against Slovenian side Pomurje. O'Reilly scored the only goal of the game, a header in the fourth minute. Following Shelbourne's elimination from the UEFA Women's Champions League, O'Reilly took temporary leave of the team, stating that she would be "joining back with the team later [in the] season."

O'Reilly joined back up with Shelbourne in October 2022, returning to action in the side's 2-0 victory against Sligo Rovers. O'Reilly enjoyed playing for Shelbourne and was pleased to contribute to their 2022 Women's National League title win: "I didn't think that the team would mean so much to me, and that I would really want to come back and help them win the league. I kept an eye on things when I went back home and, when the title race was heating up, I wanted to come back and help in any way that I could." She also made a substitute appearance in the 2022 FAI Women's Cup Final, as Shelbourne beat Athlone Town 2–0 to secure a League and Cup Double.

International career (2002–16)
In 2002, while still in high school, O'Reilly was named to the U.S. national team. O'Reilly made her first appearance with the United States women's national soccer team on March 1, 2002, against Sweden.

2002 FIFA U-19 Women's World Cup
O'Reilly was a key member of USA's U-19 winning team, scoring four goals and created seven. This helped the USA youth to win their first World Championship ever for this level.

2004 Athens Olympics
After recovering from a broken fibula from a match the year before, O'Reilly made the national team roster for the 2004 Summer Olympics in Athens. At nineteen years old, she was the youngest player on the roster. On August 23, 2004, she scored the match winning goal in the Olympic semi-final match against Germany, propelling the United States into the final, in which they defeated Brazil for the gold medal.

2007 FIFA Women's World Cup
In the 2007 FIFA Women's World Cup, O'Reilly scored a critical goal against North Korea in the 69th minute, which tied the match at 2–2 and saved the Americans from a devastating opening-round loss. The United States ended up taking the bronze medal, with O'Reilly scoring a goal during the 4–1 win against Norway. She was nominated as Sports Illustrateds 2007 Sportsman of the Year.

2008 Beijing Olympics
O'Reilly competed at the Beijing 2008 Summer Olympic games. She scored the quickest goal in Olympic women's soccer history against New Zealand to advance to the quarterfinals. She also scored a goal in the semi-final match against Japan. The team went on to defeat heavy-favorites Brazil 1–0 to win the gold medal. Prior to the Summer Games, Time magazine ranked her number 15 on its list of 100 Olympic Athletes to Watch.

2011 FIFA Women's World Cup
O'Reilly was selected for the 2011 FIFA Women's World Cup and in the second match of the group stage scored the first of three goals for USA against Colombia.

2012 London Olympics

At the 2012 Olympics in London, she made a crucial assist in the 123rd minute of the semi-final match against Canada, sending a cross from the right to Alex Morgan who headed the ball into the goal over the hand of Erin McLeod, propelling team USA to the gold medal match against Japan.

2015 FIFA Women's World Cup
O'Reilly was selected for her third World Cup in 2015.  She did not appear in any games during the tournament but became a World Cup Champion on July 5, when the United States defeated Japan 5–2 in the Women's World Cup final.  O'Reilly joined the national team on a Victory Tour following their World Cup win.

2016 Rio Olympics
To some controversy, she was left off the team by Jill Ellis and made an alternate for the 2016 Rio Olympics even with having the most caps of the squad at the time (229). The U.S. national team went on to achieve its worst ever Olympic finish, being knocked out by Sweden in the quarter-finals.

Retirement, 2016
On September 1, 2016, O'Reilly announced her retirement from the Women's National Team after 15 years. She retired on September 15 after a friendly match against Thailand, held in Columbus, Ohio, after the USWNT scored 9 goals.

International goals

Assists made in international matches
Heather O'Reilly is among the top ten players of United States women's national soccer team in providing assists.

Honors
College
Women's College Cup: 2003, 2006
Honda Sports Award: 2006–07

ClubSky Blue FCWPS Championship: 2009FC Kansas CityNWSL Champions: 2015ArsenalFA WSL Cup: 2017–18North Carolina CourageNWSL Champions: 2018, 2019
NWSL Shield: 2018, 2019Shelbourne FCWNL Champions: 2022
FAI Women's Cup: 2022

International
Olympic Gold Medal: 2004, 2008, 2012
FIFA Women's World Cup: 2015
FIFA U-19 Women's World Championship: 2002

Individual
 NWSL Second Best XI: 2014
 FIFA Puskas Award Nominee: 2011
 WPS All-Star Team: 2010
 MVP, WPS Championship Game: 2009
 WPS All-Star team selection: 2009, 2010
 Soccer America Player of the Year Award: 2006
 College Cup Offensive MVP: 2003, 2006
 ACC Offensive Player of the Year: 2005
 ESPN the Magazine All-Academic Player of the Year: 2006
 Gatorade National High School Girls' Soccer Player of the Year: 2002
 For their first match of March 2019, the women of the United States women's national soccer team each wore a jersey with the name of a woman they were honoring on the back; Kelley O'Hara chose the name of Heather O'Reilly.

Endorsements
O'Reilly has endorsement deals with Adidas. In 2013, she appeared in a commercial for Adidas' Adizero™ running shoe.

In popular culture

Magazines
In 2008, Time listed profiled O'Reilly as the No. 15 Olympic Athlete to Watch in their list of 100 Olympic Athletes To Watch. She has been featured in Fitness, Shape, Teen Vogue, Sports Illustrated, and Boston Magazine.

Video Games
O'Reilly was featured along with her national teammates in the EA Sports' FIFA video game series in FIFA 16, the first time women players were included in the game.

Ticker tape parade and White House honors
Following the United States' win at the 2015 FIFA Women's World Cup, O'Reilly and her teammates became the first women's sports team to be honored with a ticker tape parade in New York City. Each player received a key to the city from Mayor Bill de Blasio. In October of the same year, the team was honored by President Barack Obama at the White House.

Television and film
O'Reilly has made appearances with her national teammates on Late Night with David Letterman, The Today Show, The Rachel Maddow Show and Good Morning America. She was featured in the film, Winning Isn't Everything about the women's soccer program at the University of North Carolina.

Radio and other media
O'Reilly began cohosting the BBC World Service's BBC World Football program with Mani Djazmi, Pat Nevin, and Peter Odemwingie when the program changed formats in 2018.

Personal life
O'Reilly married former UNC lacrosse player Dave Werry in 2011, whom she met when the two attended UNC. Their son William was born in 2020. O'Reilly gave birth to their second child, Jack, on November 26, 2021.

She is nicknamed "HAO," the initials of her name (Heather Ann O'Reilly) and pronounced 'hey-oh'.\

See also

 List of multiple Olympic gold medalists in one event
 List of Olympic medalists in soccer
 List of soccer players with 100 or more caps
 List of University of North Carolina at Chapel Hill Olympians
 List of University of North Carolina at Chapel Hill alumni

ReferencesMatch reports'''

Further reading
 Crothers, Tim (2010), The Man Watching: Anson Dorrance and the University of North Carolina Women's Soccer Dynasty, Macmillan, 
 Grainey, Timothy (2012), Beyond Bend It Like Beckham: The Global Phenomenon of Women's Soccer, University of Nebraska Press, 
 Lisi, Clemente A. (2010), The U.S. Women's Soccer Team: An American Success Story, Scarecrow Press, 
 Stevens, Dakota (2011), A Look at the Women's Professional Soccer Including the Soccer Associations, Teams, Players, Awards, and More, BiblioBazaar, 
 Stewart, Barbara (2012), Women's Soccer: The Passionate Game'', Greystone Books Ltd,

External links

 
 
 
 Arsenal L.F.C player profile
 

1985 births
Living people
Footballers at the 2004 Summer Olympics
North Carolina Tar Heels women's soccer players
Parade High School All-Americans (girls' soccer)
East Brunswick High School alumni
People from East Brunswick, New Jersey
Sportspeople from New Brunswick, New Jersey
United States women's international soccer players
Olympic gold medalists for the United States in soccer
Footballers at the 2008 Summer Olympics
NJ/NY Gotham FC players
Footballers at the 2012 Summer Olympics
American women's soccer players
FIFA Century Club
2007 FIFA Women's World Cup players
2011 FIFA Women's World Cup players
2015 FIFA Women's World Cup players
Soccer players from New Jersey
USL W-League (1995–2015) players
Women's Premier Soccer League Elite players
National Women's Soccer League players
Boston Breakers players
Medalists at the 2012 Summer Olympics
Medalists at the 2008 Summer Olympics
Medalists at the 2004 Summer Olympics
FIFA Women's World Cup-winning players
Women's association football midfielders
FC Kansas City players
New Jersey Wildcats players
Arsenal W.F.C. players
Women's Super League players
North Carolina Courage players
American soccer commentators
Women association football commentators
Association football commentators
Women's Professional Soccer players
Shelbourne F.C. (women) players
American expatriate women's soccer players
American expatriate sportspeople in England
Expatriate women's footballers in England
American expatriate sportspeople in Ireland
Expatriate women's association footballers in Ireland
Women's National League (Ireland) players
American people of Irish descent